Poia Rewi is a professor and the head of Te Tumu: School of Maori, Pacific, and Indigenous Studies at the University of Otago in Dunedin, New Zealand. He is a Fellow of the Royal Society Te Apārangi.

Education and career 
He graduated from the University of Otago in 2005 with a Doctor of Philosophy (PhD) in Maori Studies with a thesis entitled, . This was the first thesis at the university to be written entirely in Māori.

Awards 
In March 2021, Rewi was made a Fellow of the Royal Society Te Apārangi, with recognition that he is "one of the most active research specialists in Māori culture, language revitalisation, oral history and performing arts".

Selected works 
Rewi, P. (2006). Te Rakiraki Anuanu! In P. Walker & H. Raven (Eds.), Te Tū a Te Toka: He Ieretanga nō ngā Tai e Whā. (pp. 17–20). Wellington, New Zealand: Toi Māori Aotearoa.
Rewi, P. (2010). Whaikōrero: The world of Māori oratory. Auckland University Press.
As editor: Hokowhitu, B., Kermoal, N., Andersen, C., Petersen, A., Reilly, M., Altamirano-Jiménez, I., & Rewi, P. (Eds.). (2010). Indigenous identity and resistance: Researching the diversity of knowledge. Dunedin, New Zealand: Otago University Press.
Rewi, P. (2010). Culture: Compromise or perish! In B. Hokowhitu, N. Kermaol, C. Andersen, A. Petersen, M. Reilly, I. Altamirano-Jiménez & P. Rewi (Eds.), Indigenous identity and resistance: Researching the diversity of knowledge. (pp. 55–74). Dunedin, New Zealand: Otago University Press.

Personal life
Rewi is of Ngati Manawa, Te Arawa and Tuhoe descent.

References

New Zealand Māori academics
University of Otago alumni
Year of birth missing (living people)
Living people
Fellows of the Royal Society of New Zealand
Ngāti Manawa people
Te Arawa people
Ngāi Tūhoe people